Aepsera ferruginea is a species of beetle in the family Carabidae, the only species in the genus Aepsera.

References

Platyninae